The College of Medicine and Veterinary Medicine is one of the three colleges of the University of Edinburgh.

Structure
The College of Medicine and Veterinary Medicine is composed of two schools, with subgroups and research institutes included under them:
 Royal (Dick) School of Veterinary Studies
 Edinburgh Medical School
 Edinburgh Medical School: Biomedical Sciences
Biomedical Teaching Organisation
Centre for Cognitive and Neural Systems
Centre for Integrative Physiology
Centre for Neuroregeneration
Division of Infection and Pathway Medicine
 Edinburgh Medical School: Clinical Sciences
 BHF Centre for Cardiovascular Sciences
 Centre for Clinical Brain Sciences
 MRC Centre for Inflammation Research
 Scottish Centre for Regenerative Medicine
 Centre for Reproductive Health
 Edinburgh Postgraduate Dental Institute
 Division of Health Sciences
 Edinburgh Medical School: Molecular, Genetic and Population Health Sciences
MRC Institute of Genetics and Molecular Medicine
Edinburgh Cancer Research Centre
Usher Institute of Population Health Sciences and Informatics
Edinburgh Clinical Trials Unit
Division of Pathology

External links
 

College of Medicine and Veterinary Medicine